Steven Patrick Bayley (born 9 June 1971) is a Paralympic medalist from New Zealand who competed in alpine skiing. He competed in the 1998 Winter Paralympics where he won a bronze medal in Giant Slalom. He also competed in the 2002 Winter Paralympics in Salt Lake City where he won a bronze medal in the Downhill and Super G and a gold medal in the Giant Slalom. Steven (Or Steve as he is called) grew up on the family farm near birdlings flat and as a child was interested in many activities, such as kayaking, cycling, biking, fishing and of course skiing. Unfortunately around the age of 25, Bayley was in a car crash that resulted in the need for leg amputation. He was told that they could find no way for them to put his original leg back on, so he now wears prosthetic legs.

References

External links 
 
 

1971 births
Living people
New Zealand male alpine skiers
Paralympic alpine skiers of New Zealand
Paralympic bronze medalists for New Zealand
Paralympic gold medalists for New Zealand
Paralympic medalists in alpine skiing
Alpine skiers at the 1998 Winter Paralympics
Alpine skiers at the 2002 Winter Paralympics
Medalists at the 1998 Winter Paralympics
Medalists at the 2002 Winter Paralympics